Ghulam Murtaza Khan Jatoi (born 4 September 1958) is a Pakistani politician who served as Minister for Industries and Production, in Abbasi cabinet from August 2017 to May 2018. A former leader of the Pakistan Muslim League (Nawaz), Jatoi served as the Minister for Industries and Production in the third Sharif ministry. and previously held the cabinet portfolios of Minister for Communications during the first Sharif's ministry from 1990 to 1992, and as Minister for Overseas Pakistanis during the Second Bhutto ministry from 1993 to 1994.

Jatoi had been a member of the National Assembly of Pakistan representing Naushahro Feroze and served as Sindh Provincial Minister for Irrigation from 1997 to 2002 during the Sharif's second ministry.

Early life and education

Jatoi was born on 4 September 1958 to Ghulam Mustafa Jatoi who is a former caretaker prime minister of Pakistan. Jatoi got his early education from Grand Folks School and St. Patrick's College. He did his Graduation and Masters from Sindh University.

Political career
Jatoi started his political career after getting elected as Chairman District Council, Nawab Shah in 1979. He was elected as a member of Provincial Assembly of Sindh for the first time in 1988 Pakistani general election and was appointed as provincial minister for Government of Sindh where he served from 1988 to 1990.

He was elected as member of National Assembly of Pakistan for the first time in 1990 Pakistani general election and was appointed as the Minister for Communications where he served from 1990 to 1992.

He was re-elected as the member of the National Assembly for the second time in 1993 Pakistani general election and was appointed as Minister for Overseas Pakistanis for a brief period. He was re-elected as member of Sindh Assembly in 1997 Pakistani general election and appointed as provincial minister for Irrigation. He also held the office of Advisor to Chief Minister of Sindh on Agriculture from 2004 to 2007. He was re-elected as member of National Assembly for the third time in 2008 Pakistani general election.

In May 2013, his party National Peoples Party of which he was the President merged with PML-N.

He was re-elected as the member of National Assembly in 2013 Pakistani general election and was appointed as the Minister for Industries & Production in Sharif's third ministry.

He had ceased to hold ministerial office in July 2017 when the federal cabinet was disbanded following the resignation of Prime Minister Nawaz Sharif after Panama Papers case decision. Following the election of Shahid Khaqan Abbasi as Prime Minister of Pakistan in August 2017, he was inducted into the federal cabinet of Abbasi. He was appointed as federal minister for Industry and Production. Upon the dissolution of the National Assembly on the expiration of its term on 31 May 2018, Jatoi ceased to hold the office as Federal Minister for Industries and Production.

Before General election 2018, he merged National Peoples Party with Grand Democratic Alliance (GDA) emerged before general elections, and he contested as member of national assembly from NA-212 constituency on GDA seat but lost after winning the constituency by Zulfiqar Ali Behan of Pakistan Peoples Party.

References

|-

|-

|-

1958 births
Living people
Sindh MPAs 1997–1999
Sindh MPAs 1988–1990
Pakistani MNAs 1990–1993
Pakistani MNAs 1993–1996
Pakistani MNAs 2008–2013
Pakistani MNAs 2013–2018
Pakistan Muslim League (N) politicians
Government ministers of Pakistan
People from Naushahro Feroze District
St. Patrick's College (Karachi) alumni
University of Sindh alumni
Ghulam Murtaza
Provincial ministers of Sindh